Christian Duvaleix (1923–1979) was a French stage and film actor. He was born in Tunis which was then part of French Tunisia, the son of Albert Duvaleix. He was a character actor appearing in a number of supporting roles. He was one of the members of the acting troupe Branquignols.

Selected filmography
 Les aventures des pieds nickeles (1948)
 Doctor Laennec (1949)
 Branquignol (1949)
 The Cupid Club (1949)
 We Will All Go to Paris (1950)
 The King of the Bla Bla Bla (1951)
 No Vacation for Mr. Mayor (1951)
 Saluti e baci (1953)
 The Tour of the Grand Dukes (1953)
 Au diable la vertu (1954)
 The Pirates of the Bois de Boulogne (1954)
 Hello Smile ! (1956)
 Love in Jamaica (1957)
 Comme un cheveu sur la soupe (1957)
 Life Together (1958)
 La Tour, prends garde ! (1958)
 La Belle Américaine (1961)
 Isadora (1968)
 Le Plumard en folie (1974)
 Un linceul n'a pas de poches (1974)
 Parisian Life (1977)

References

Bibliography
 Goble, Alan. The Complete Index to Literary Sources in Film. Walter de Gruyter, 1999.
 Rège, Philippe. Encyclopedia of French Film Directors, Volume 1. Scarecrow Press, 2009.

External links

1923 births
1979 deaths
French male television actors
French male film actors
People from Tunis